Tafon Nchukwi (born 14 October 1994) is a Cameroonian mixed martial artist who competes in the Middleweight division of the Ultimate Fighting Championship.

Background
Born in Bamenda, Cameroon, Nchukwi's family moved to the United States in 2005. He played soccer in his youth, changing to football, baseball and wrestling during his high school years. He attended college, but dropped out after discovering mixed martial arts.

Nchukwi is a WKA ×2 2016 National champion, WKA ×2 2017 national champion, WKA ×2 2016 World champion. He is also a Jiu-jitsu blue belt and a 2017 IBJJF PAN Silver medalist.

Nchukwi flies the flag of the separatist banner of the Republic of Ambazonia.

Mixed martial arts career

Early career
Making his MMA debut at CFFC 73, Nchukwi faced Alex Meyers and went on to defeat him via TKO in the second round. In his sophomore performance, Tafon defeated A.T. McCowin via TKO in round one at Shogun Fights 23. Returning to Cage Fury Fighting Championships at CFFC 80, he defeated William Knight via TKO in the first round. The win was controversial as the ref thought Knight was knocked out when covering up, for which the ref apologized afterwards.

In the main event of Dana White's Contender Series 32, Nchukwi knocked out Al Matavao in the second round. The victory earned Nchukwi a contract from the UFC in the process.

Ultimate Fighting Championship
In his promotional debut, Nchukwi faced Jamie Pickett at UFC Fight Night: Thompson vs. Neal on December 19, 2020. After knocking down Pickett in the third round, Nchukwi won the fight via unanimous decision.

In his sophomore appearance, Nchukwi faced Jun Yong Park on May 8, 2021 at UFC on ESPN: Rodriguez vs. Waterson. He lost the fight via majority decision after being deducted a point due to repeated groin strikes.

Nchukwi faced Mike Rodríguez at UFC Fight Night: Smith vs. Spann on September 18, 2021. He won the fight via unanimous decision.

Nchukwi faced Azamat Murzakanov on March 12, 2022 at UFC Fight Night 203 Despite winning most of the bout, Nchukwi lost the bout after getting knocked out by a flying knee in round three.

Nchukwi faced Carlos Ulberg on June 25, 2022, at UFC on ESPN 38 He lost the fight via TKO in the first round.

Nchukwi was scheduled to face Jamal Pogues on December 17, 2022 at UFC Fight Night 216. However, Pogues pull out from the bout due to undisclosed reason and was replaced by Vitor Petrino. Nchukwi eventually pulled out of the bout himself due to undisclosed reasons and the bout was scrapped.

Mixed martial arts record

|-
|Loss
|align=center|6–3
|Carlos Ulberg
|TKO (punches)	
|UFC on ESPN: Tsarukyan vs. Gamrot
|
|align=center|1
|align=center|1:15
|Las Vegas, Nevada, United States
|
|-
|Loss
|align=center|6–2
|Azamat Murzakanov
|KO (flying knee)
|UFC Fight Night: Santos vs. Ankalaev
|
|align=center|3
|align=center|0:44
|Las Vegas, Nevada, United States
|
|-
|Win
|align=center|6–1
|Mike Rodríguez
|Decision (unanimous)
|UFC Fight Night: Smith vs. Spann
|
|align=center|3
|align=center|5:00
|Las Vegas, Nevada, United States
|
|-
|Loss
|align=center|5–1
|Jun Yong Park
|Decision (majority)
|UFC on ESPN: Rodriguez vs. Waterson
|
|align=center|3
|align=center|5:00
|Las Vegas, Nevada, United States
|
|-
|Win
|align=center|5–0
|Jamie Pickett
|Decision (unanimous)
|UFC Fight Night: Thompson vs. Neal
|
|align=center|3
|align=center|5:00
|Las Vegas, Nevada, United States
|
|-
|Win
|align=center|4–0
|Al Matavao
|KO (head kick)
|Dana White's Contender Series 32
|
|align=center|2
|align=center|2:01
|Las Vegas, Nevada, United States
|
|-
|Win
|align=center|3–0
|William Knight
|TKO (punches)
|CFFC 80
|
|align=center|1
|align=center|2:30
|Hampton, Virginia, United States
|
|-
|Win
|align=center|2–0
|A.T. McCowin
|TKO (strikes)
|Shogun Fights 23
|
|align=center|1
|align=center|2:27
|Baltimore, Maryland, United States
|
|-
|Win
|align=center|1–0
|Alex Meyers
|TKO
|CFFC 73
|
|align=center|2
|align=center|2:15
|Philadelphia, Pennsylvania, United States
|
|-

See also 
 List of current UFC fighters
 List of male mixed martial artists

References

External links 
  
 

1994 births
Living people
Cameroonian male mixed martial artists
Middleweight mixed martial artists
Mixed martial artists utilizing kickboxing
Mixed martial artists utilizing Brazilian jiu-jitsu
Cameroonian practitioners of Brazilian jiu-jitsu
Ultimate Fighting Championship male fighters
People from Bamenda